Deuda may refer to:
Deuda (film), 2004
Deuda (genre), song and dance genre from Nepal
"Deuda" (bolero), 1945 song by Luis Marquetti, recorded by Arsenio Rodríguez and others